Bitte Berg (born February 21, 1961) is a Swedish female curler.

Teams

Personal life
Her husband is fellow curler Connie Östlund, as is their daughter, Cecilia Östlund.

References

External links
 

Living people
1961 births
Swedish female curlers
Swedish curling champions